WVWV is a public radio formatted broadcast radio station licensed to Huntington, West Virginia, serving Huntington, West Virginia, Ashland, Kentucky, and Ironton, Ohio.  WVWV is owned and operated by West Virginia Educational Broadcasting Authority.

References

External links
West Virginia Public Broadcasting Online

NPR member stations
VDM